Kruta Balka is a settlement in Yasynuvata Raion (district) in Donetsk Oblast of eastern Ukraine, at 17.2 km NNE from the centre of Donetsk city.

The settlement was taken under control of pro-Russian forces during the War in Donbass, that started in mid-April 2014.

Demographics
Native language as of the Ukrainian Census of 2001:
Ukrainian 9.51%
Russian 90.49%

References

Villages in Donetsk Raion